École-Valentin is a commune in the Doubs department in the Bourgogne-Franche-Comté region in eastern France.

Population

Geography

The town, located north of Besançon, is crossed by the National Road 57. It is part of the Besançon urban area.
The toll of the "Besançon North" exit of the A36 motorway is located in the village of Ecole-Valentin. École-Valentin station has rail connections with Besançon and the TGV station Besançon Franche-Comté.
A major shopping area is located in the town of École-Valentin (as well as the neighboring towns of Miserey-Salines and Châtillon-le-Duc).

Transport
 Gare d'École-Valentin

Sights
 Fountain below the village, called St. George fountain, dating from 1630, located on the ancient Roman paved road linking Besançon Vesoul, where the animals could drink.
 Priory
 Church of St. George: 1892/83
 Castle built from 1557 to 1559 by the Commander of the Order of the Hospital of the Holy Spirit, Claude Buffet.

International relations
It is twinned with Rathcoole in County Dublin, Ireland.

See also
 Communes of the Doubs department

References

Communes of Doubs